Golubinskaya is a rural locality (a stanitsa) and the administrative center of Golubinskoye Rural Settlement, Kalachyovsky District, Volgograd Oblast, Russia. The population was 1,221 as of 2010. There are 29 streets.

Geography 
Golubinskaya is located in steppe, on the right bank of the Don River, 39 km north of Kalach-na-Donu (the district's administrative centre) by road. Malogolubinsky is the nearest rural locality.

References 

Rural localities in Kalachyovsky District